Sithu Aung Myint is a Burmese journalist and political commentator, best known as a columnist for Frontier Myanmar, and as a contributor to VOA since 2014.

In the aftermath of the 2021 Myanmar coup d'état, he was arrested by authorities on 15 August 2021 for publishing several articles that critiqued the military junta and allegedly backing the opposing National Unity Government of Myanmar. On 7 October 2022, he was sentenced to three years in prison for incitement under section 505(a) of Myanmar's penal code. He remains at Insein Prison, where he faces a life sentence for defamation, and another 20 years for sedition. On 9 December, he was sentenecd to another 7 years of hard labour.

References

External links 

 

Burmese writers
Living people
Burmese prisoners and detainees
Burmese journalists